Ai is an unincorporated community in Gilmer County, Georgia, United States.

A post office called Ai was established in 1920, and remained in operation until 1932. The community was named after Ai, a place mentioned in the Hebrew Bible. Ai was located inland away from the railroad.

References 

Unincorporated communities in Georgia (U.S. state)
Unincorporated communities in Gilmer County, Georgia